The Residences of the Royal House of Savoy are a group of buildings in Turin and the Metropolitan City of Turin, in Piedmont (northern Italy). It was added to the UNESCO World Heritage Sites list in 1997.

History
The House of Savoy is an ancient royal family, being founded in year 1003 in the Savoy region (now in Rhône-Alpes, France), later expanding so that by 1720 it reigned over the Kingdom of Sardinia in northwestern Italy. Through its junior branch, the House of Savoy-Carignano, it led the unification of Italy in 1861 and ruled the Kingdom of Italy from 1861 until the end of World War II. At this time, King Victor Emanuel III abdicated in favour of his son Umberto II but after an institutional referendum in 1946, the monarchy was abolished, a republic was established, and members of the House of Savoy were required to leave the country.

In 1562, Emmanuel Philibert, Duke of Savoy moved his capital to Turin and commenced a series of building projects using the best architects available at the time. The buildings, lavishly constructed and including embellishments by contemporary artists, were designed to impress the public and demonstrate the power of the House of Savoy. As well as palaces in Turin itself, country houses and hunting lodges were built in the surrounding countryside. All these buildings have been jointly listed as a UNESCO World Heritage Site on the basis that they "represent the best in European monumental architecture from the 17th and 18th centuries, expressing in their style and opulence a potent demonstration of the power of absolute monarchy in material terms".

Residences
In Turin:
Palazzo Reale
Palazzo Madama
Palazzo Carignano
Castello del Valentino
Villa della Regina
In  Metropolitan City of Turin
Palazzina di Stupinigi
Reggia di Venaria Reale
Castle of La Mandria
Castle of Rivoli
Castle of Moncalieri
Castle of Racconigi
In Piedmont
Castle of Agliè
Pollenzo Estate
Castle of Govone

See also
County of Savoy
Duchy of Savoy
Kingdom of Sardinia
Kingdom of Italy

References

External links
UNESCO.org: Residences of the Royal House of Savoy World Heritage Site

 
Duchy of Savoy
House of Savoy
Palaces in Piedmont
Royal residences in Italy
Buildings and structures in Turin
Buildings and structures in the Metropolitan City of Turin
Buildings and structures in the Province of Cuneo
World Heritage Sites in Italy